Cropera is a genus of moths in the subfamily Lymantriinae. The genus was erected by Francis Walker in 1855.

Species
Cropera confalonierii Berio, 1937
Cropera celaenogyia Collenette, 1936 Angola
Cropera modesta (Schaus & Clements, 1893) Sierra Leone
Cropera nigripes (Hampson, 1910) northern Nigeria
Cropera phaeophlebia (Hampson, 1910) Congo
Cropera phlebilis (Hampson, 1905) Zimbabwe
Cropera sericea (Hampson, 1910) southern Africa
Cropera sericoptera Collenette, 1932 Angola
Cropera seydeli (Hering, 1932) Zaire, Angola
Cropera stilpnaroma Hering, 1926
Cropera sudanica (Strand, 1915) Sudan
Cropera testacea Walker, 1855 southern and eastern Africa, Sudan
Cropera unipunctata Wichgraf, 1921 Congo
Cropera xanthophaes Collenette, 1960 Congo

References

Lymantriinae